Akpro-Missérété is a city, arrondissement, and commune in Ouémé Department, Benin. The commune covers an area of 79 square kilometres and as of 2013 had a population of 127,249 people.

References

Communes of Benin
Arrondissements of Benin
Populated places in the Ouémé Department